Josefa  may refer to:

 649 Josefa, a minor planet
 Josefa (given name), a unisex given name

See also

 Josepha
 José